Orthos (Ὄρθοι, or Ὄρθα) was a town and polis (city-state) in ancient Thessaly. 

The city appears in epigraphic texts dated to the 4th century BCE. In an inscription at Delphi of the year 341/0 BCE the name appears in genitive form (Ὄρθου). In addition, bronze coins of Orthos dated between the 4th and 2nd centuries BCE are preserved with the legends «ΟΡΘΙ», «ΟΡΘΙΕΩΝ» and «ΟΡΘΙΕΙΩΝ». The city's name appears in a list of theorodokoi at Delphi dated to  

Its location is northeast of modern village of Kedros

References

Populated places in ancient Thessaly
Former populated places in Greece
Thessalian city-states